Divina Pastora is a municipality located in the Brazilian state of Sergipe. The Parish Church of Our Lady of the Divine Shepherd (Igreja Matriz de Nossa Senhora Divina Pastora), a listed historic structure by the National Institute of Historic and Artistic Heritage (IPHAN), was constructed in the late 18th century and is located at the east of the city center.

See also
Divina Pastora (Barquisimeto)

References

Municipalities in Sergipe